is a professional Japanese baseball player. He is a pitcher for the Hanshin Tigers of Nippon Professional Baseball (NPB).

References 

1999 births
Living people
Nippon Professional Baseball pitchers
Baseball people from Mie Prefecture
Hanshin Tigers players
2023 World Baseball Classic players